Janne Korhonen may refer to:
 Janne Korhonen (footballer) (born 1979), Finnish footballer
 Janne Korhonen (taekwondo) (born 1970), Finnish taekwondo practitioner